Cunnie Williams (born 17 March 1963) is an American R&B singer whose voice has been compared to Barry White.

Williams was born in Los Angeles, California, USA, in 1963.  After playing basketball, he switched to a career in music with his debut album Comin' from the Heart of the Ghetto.  His hits have included the single "Saturday" which charted in Italy, the song "Come Back to Me" which charted in France, and the album Night Time in Paris which charted in France.  Williams' song "Life Goes On" is on the soundtrack of the movie The Magnet.

Discography

Albums

1995 : Comin' from the Heart of the Ghetto
1996 : Love Starved Heart
1999 : Star Hotel
2002 : Night Time in Paris
2004 : Inside My Soul
2008 : No Place Like Home

Singles

References

External links
 Artist page at Universal Music 

1963 births
Living people
American contemporary R&B singers
21st-century African-American male singers
20th-century African-American male singers